The Officers Training Academy (OTA) is a training establishment of the Indian Army that trains officers for the Short Service Commission (SSC). The 49-week course at the OTA prepares graduates for all branches of the Army, except for the Army Medical Corps. Established in 1963, the first academy is located in Alandur, a southern neighbourhood of Chennai. 
OTA chennai has an impressive tally of gallantry award including 1 Param Vir Chakra, 8 Ashoka Chakra, 10 Maha Vir Chakra, 22 Kirti Chakra, 63 Vir Chakra, 119 Shaurya Chakra and 587 Sena Medal earned by the officers commissioned from this academy bears testimony to the Valor and dedication displayed by the Alumni. 
A new academy was set up at Gaya in 2011; but was given the go-ahead in December 2019 to be disbanded.

History

OTA Chennai

Seven Officers Training Schools were established in India between 1942–45 to meet the huge demand for officers to serve in the Indian and Commonwealth Armies during World War II. However, these schools were closed down at the end of the war.

In 1962, following the Sino-Indian War, India identified the need to expand the number of officers for effective operations. Two Officers Training Schools (OTS) were established in Pune and Madras (now known as Chennai) to train officers for Emergency Commission into the Army. The process of establishing the schools was begun in September 1962. The Chennai school was inaugurated on 15 January 1963, for nation by and with Brigadier Ram Singh as its first Commandant. The Pune school had a short run and was closed in 1964. However, the school in Chennai continued to operate and on 2 February 1965, it obtained the sanction to shift focus to train officers for the Short Service Regular Commission.

The Short Service Regular Commission has evolved into the Short Service Commission, and the OTS has continued to train officers for these commissions. The school was granted permanent status in 1985. On 1 January 1988, the school was renamed as the Officers Training Academy (OTA), on a par with the NDA and IMA.

The first batch of 25 women to be commissioned as officers into the Army were trained at the OTA, with training commencing on 21 September 1992.

Cadets are organised in 2 Battalions namely Ranjith Singh Battalion and Shivaji Battalion. RS Bn consists of three companies, namely, Kohima, Jessami, and Phillora; Shivaji Bn consists of three companies, namely, Meiktila, Naushera and Zojila.

OTA Gaya
OTA Gaya, set up in 2011, is located amid an estate of approximately 870 acres in a hilly terrain of Paharpur at Gaya. The academy is located en route from Gaya to Bodhgaya, approx 7 km from Gaya railway station. The international airport of Gaya is adjacent to the academy. In its vicinity is Bodhgaya, an international tourism destination. Gaya Cantonment dates back to World War II, as one of the headquarters of the British Army.

To mark the commencement of the academy, a flag hoisting ceremony was solemnised and the consecration of the raising of the academy was carried out in true secular tradition of the Indian Army, with recital of scriptures from holy books of different religions.

The academy has been equipped with state of the art training facilities, at par with other pre-commissioning training institutions.

The insignia of Officers Training Academy, Gaya has a two-colour background, with upper half as grey and the lower half blood-red, having two cross swords superimposed with the Dharmchakra. A scroll below bears the motto of the academy – 'Shaurya, Gyan, Sankalp' in devnagri.

The first batch of 149 trainee-officers underwent training in the academy during the period July 2011 to Jun 2012 and the first passing out parade was conducted on 8 June 2012. The second batch after successful completion of their training (January 2012 – December 2012) passed out on 8 December 2012. A total of 176 cadets from TES 26 and SCO 29 courses passed out on 8 December 2012. The academy had capacity to train 350 cadets. Lt Gen Sunil Srivastava, VSM (double bar)  is the current commandant of the academy, having taken charge in 2018.

In December 2019 the Defence Ministry gave the go-ahead to shut OTA Gaya due to lack of intake.

Notable alumni 
The academy has produced many war heroes and distinguished officers. Many have gone on to work for corporations after leaving the Indian Army. The OTA Alumni Association was registered under the Societies Act 1860 at Chandigarh with all India jurisdiction.

Param Vir Chakra 
Maj. Ramaswamy Parameshwaran – 8th battalion, Mahar Regiment, Posthumous

Ashoka Chakra 
Maj. D. Sreeram Kumar – on deputation to 39th battalion, Assam Rifles
Lt. Navdeep Singh (posthumous) – 15th battalion, Maratha Light Infantry
Capt. Jas Ram Singh – 6th battalion, Rajput Regiment
Capt. Jasbir Singh Raina – 10th battalion, Brigade of the Guards
2Lt. Cyrus A. Pithawalla – 17th battalion, Jammu & Kashmir Rifles
Lt. Col. Harsh Uday Singh Gaur – 10th battalion, Bihar Regiment
 Maj. Mukund Varadarajan (posthumous) – 44th battalion, Rashtriya Rifles
Col. Jojan Thomas (posthumous) – 45th battalion, Rashtriya Rifles

Mahavir Chakra 
 Brigadier Kuldip Singh Chandpuri – 23rd battalion, Punjab Regiment
 2/Lt. S. S. Samra (posthumous) – Brigade of The Guards
 Maj. P.S. Ganapathi – 8th battalion, Mahar Regiment
 Maj. Krishna Gopal Chatterjee – 3rd battalion, 4 Gorkha Rifles
 2/Lt. Rajeev Sandhu – 7th battalion, Assam Regiment 
 Maj. Padmapani Acharya (posthumous) – 2nd battalion, Rajputana Rifles
 Col. Sonam Wangchuk – Ladakh Scouts
 Lt. Balwan Singh – 18th battalion, The Grenadiers
 Lt. Keishing Clifford Nongrum (posthumous) – 12th battalion, Jammu and Kashmir Light Infantry
 Capt. Pratap Singh (posthumous) – 75 Medium Regiment

Vir Chakra 
Capt. Jintu Gogoi (posthumous) – 17 Garhwal Rifles
Capt. Jerry Prem Raj (posthumous) – 158 Medium Regiment
Late Lt Col. Vikram Deuskar - 76 Armoured Regiment

Others
Capt. Tania Shergill became the first Indian woman Parade Adjutant to lead an all-men contingent at an Army Day function in Indian Army.

President's Colours 

Colour Presentation

The coveted Presidential Colours to the Academy was presented on 18 August 1990 by Shri R Venkataraman, the then President of India.

List of Commandants 
The Commandant of the Officers Training Academy is the overall in-charge of all the functioning of the Officers Training Academy, Chennai. The Commandant of the College is a three-star rank officer (Lieutenant General) from the Indian Army. He is supported by the Deputy Commandant and Chief Instructor (DCCI), held by a Major General.

OTA Chennai

OTA Gaya

In Popular Culture 
 OTA : Saga of excellence,  Patriot by Major Gaurav Arya

 : Women of Honour: Destination Army, by Nat Geo. The special feature follows two lady cadets through their journey at the Officer’s Training Academy where they undergo rigorous training to join the Indian Army.

See also
 Indian National Defence University
 Military academies in India
 Sainik school
 Officers Training Academy Band

References

Military academies of India
Colleges affiliated to University of Madras
Educational institutions established in 1963
1963 establishments in Madras State